This is a list of diplomatic missions of Yemen, excluding honorary consulates.

Africa

 Algiers (Embassy)

 Djibouti (Embassy)

 Cairo (Embassy)

 Asmara (Embassy)

 Addis Ababa (Embassy)

 Nairobi (Embassy)

 Tripoli (Embassy)

 Nouakchott (Embassy)

 Rabat (Embassy)

 Pretoria (Embassy)

 Khartoum (Embassy)

 Dar es Salaam (Embassy)

 Tunis (Embassy)

Americas

 Ottawa (Embassy)

 Havana (Embassy)

 Washington, D.C. (Embassy)

Asia

 Manama (Embassy)

 Beijing (Embassy)

 New Delhi (Embassy)

 Jakarta (Embassy)

 Tehran (Embassy) – nominated by the Supreme Political Council

 Baghdad (Embassy)

 Tokyo (Embassy)

 Amman (Embassy)

 Kuwait City (Embassy)

 Beirut (Embassy)

 Kuala Lumpur (Embassy)

 Muscat (Embassy)

 Islamabad (Embassy)

 Doha (Embassy)

 Riyadh (Embassy)
 Jeddah (Consulate-General)

 Damascus (Embassy) – nominated by the Supreme Political Council

 Ankara (Embassy)

 Abu Dhabi (Embassy)

Europe

 Vienna (Embassy)

 Brussels (Embassy)

 Sofia (Embassy)

 Prague (Embassy)

 Paris (Embassy)

 Berlin (Embassy)

 Budapest (Embassy)

 Rome (Embassy)

 The Hague (Embassy)

 Warsaw (Embassy)

 Moscow (Embassy)

 Madrid (Embassy)

 Geneva (Consulate-General)

 London (Embassy)

Multilateral organisations
 
 Brussels (Permanent Mission)
 
 Cairo (Permanent Mission)
 
 New York City (Permanent Delegation)

Gallery

Non-resident diplomatic missions 

 (Havana)
 (Jakarta)
 (Havana)
 (Paris)
 (Tokyo)
 (Kuala Lumpur)
 (Kuala Lumpur)
 (Tokyo)

See also

 Foreign relations of Yemen

External links
 Ministry of Foreign Affairs of Yemen (Arabic)
 Details of diplomatic missions of Yemen

Diplomatic missions
Yemen